During the 1990–91 season Sunderland competed in the Football League First Division, the League Cup and the FA Cup. They finished 19th in the First Division and were relegated. Marco Gabbiadini was the top scorer in the First Division with 9 goals. They were knocked out of the League Cup in Round 3. Marco Gabbiadini was the top scorer in the League Cup with 2 goals. They were knocked out of The FA Cup in Round 3. No Sunderland players scored in the FA Cup. Marco Gabbiadini was the top scorer in all competitions with 11 goals. At the end of the season, Kevin Ball won the club's official Player Of The Season award, as well as the SAFC Supporters' Association Player Of The Season award.

Players

First-team squad

Results
Sunderland's score comes first.

League Cup

FA Cup

Football League First Division

Final league table

Goal scorers

References 

Sunderland A.F.C. seasons
Sunderland A.F.C